The First Black Mountain Expedition was a British-Indian military expedition to the North-West Frontier Province in Pakistan. 

The war began when two British customs officers were killed by tribesmen.

References

Military expeditions